Patrick O'Donoghue (1930–1989) was a Northern Ireland politician active in the Social Democratic and Labour Party (SDLP) for a number of years.

A native of Castlewellan and an active member of the Gaelic Athletic Association and Association for Legal Justice, O'Donoghue represented the SDLP on Down District Council from 1973 to 1985.

O'Donoghue was elected to the Northern Ireland Assembly in the 1973 election for South Down and served as Deputy Speaker of this body. He also served in the Northern Ireland Constitutional Convention and returned to the Assembly in the 1982 election.

References

1930 births
1989 deaths
Members of Down District Council
Members of the Northern Ireland Assembly 1973–1974
Members of the Northern Ireland Constitutional Convention
Northern Ireland MPAs 1982–1986
Social Democratic and Labour Party politicians